The Seducer of Granada (Spanish:El seductor de Granada) is a 1953 Argentine-Spanish comedy film directed by Lucas Demare and starring Luis Sandrini and Malvina Pastorino.

Cast

References

Bibliography 
 Alberto Elena. El cine del tercer mundo: diccionario de realizadores. Turfan, 1993.

External links 
 

1953 comedy films
Argentine comedy films
Spanish comedy films
1953 films
1950s Spanish-language films
Films directed by Lucas Demare
Suevia Films films
Films scored by Juan Quintero Muñoz
1950s Argentine films